Saint Edmund may refer to:

 Saint Edmund the Martyr (d. 869), king of East Anglia who was venerated as a martyr saint soon after his death at the hands of Vikings
 Saint Edmund Arrowsmith (1585–1628), Jesuit, one of the Forty Martyrs of England and Wales
 Saint Edmund Campion (1540–1581), English Jesuit priest and martyr
 Saint Edmund Gennings (1567–1591), English priest and martyr
 Saint Edmund Rich (1175–1240), otherwise Edmund of Abingdon, Archbishop of Canterbury

  a British Rail car ferry

See also
 Saint Edmond
 Edmund (given name)